Tomaree High School is a government-funded co-educational comprehensive secondary day school, located in Salamander Bay, a suburb of the Port Stephens Council local government area in New South Wales, Australia. 

Established in 1988, the school enrolled approximately 1,110 students in 2018, from Year 7 to Year 12, of whom eight percent identified as Indigenous Australians and eight percent were from a language background other than English. The school is operated by the NSW Department of Education; the principal is Paul Baxter.

Overview 
A crossbow shooting incident occurred at the school in April 2003. Two 16-year-old girls were injured during the incident. A 16-year-old male was charged with attempted murder, two counts of maliciously wounding with intent to cause grievous bodily harm, possession of a prohibited weapon, and throwing an explosive. However, his homemade explosive did not work.

See also 

 List of government schools in New South Wales
 Education in Australia

References

External links 
Tomaree High School website
NSW Schools website

Public high schools in New South Wales
Port Stephens Council
Educational institutions established in 1998
1998 establishments in Australia